Ethnomycology is the study of the historical uses and sociological impact of fungi and can be considered a subfield of ethnobotany or ethnobiology. Although in theory the term includes fungi used for such purposes as tinder, medicine (medicinal mushrooms) and food (including yeast), it is often used in the context of the study of psychoactive mushrooms such as psilocybin mushrooms, the Amanita muscaria mushroom, and the ergot fungus.

American banker Robert Gordon Wasson pioneered interest in this field of study in the late 1950s, when he and his wife became the first Westerners on record allowed to participate in a mushroom velada, held by the Mazatec curandera María Sabina. The biologist Richard Evans Schultes is also considered an ethnomycological pioneer.  Later researchers in the field include Terence McKenna, Albert Hofmann, Ralph Metzner, Carl Ruck, Blaise Daniel Staples, Giorgio Samorini, Keewaydinoquay Peschel, John Marco Allegro, Clark Heinrich, John W. Allen, Jonathan Ott, Paul Stamets, Casey Brown and Juan Camilo Rodríguez Martínez.

Besides mycological determination in the field, ethnomycology depends to a large extent on anthropology and philology. One of the major debates among ethnomycologists is Wasson's theory that the Soma mentioned in the Rigveda of the Indo-Aryans was the Amanita muscaria mushroom. Following his example similar attempts have been made to identify psychoactive mushroom usage in many other (mostly) ancient cultures, with varying degrees of credibility. Another much written about topic is the content of the Kykeon, the sacrament used during the Eleusinian mysteries in ancient Greece between approximately 1500 BCE and 396 CE. Although not an ethnomycologist as such, philologist John Allegro has made an important contribution suggesting, in a book controversial enough to have his academic career destroyed, that Amanita muscaria was not only consumed as a sacrament but was the main focus of worship in the more esoteric sects of Sumerian religion, Judaism and early Christianity. Clark Heinrich claims that Amanita muscaria use in Europe was not completely wiped out by Orthodox Christianity but continued to be used (either consumed or merely symbolically) by individuals and small groups such as medieval Holy Grail myth makers, alchemists and Renaissance artists.

While Wasson views historical mushroom use primarily as a facilitator for the shamanic or spiritual experiences core to these rites and traditions, McKenna takes this further, positing that the ingestion of psilocybin was perhaps primary in the formation of language and culture and identifying psychedelic mushrooms as the original "Tree of Knowledge". There is indeed some research supporting the theory that psilocybin ingestion temporarily increases neurochemical activity in the language centers of the brain, indicating a need for more research into the uses of psychoactive plants and fungi in human history.

The 1990s saw a surge in the recreational use of psilocybin mushrooms due to a combination of a psychedelic revival in the rave culture, improved and simplified cultivation techniques, and the distribution of both the mushrooms themselves and information about them via the Internet. This "mushrooming of mushroom use" has also caused an increased popularization of ethnomycology itself as there are many websites and Internet forums where mushroom references in Christmas and fairy tale symbolism are discussed. It remains open to interpretation what effect this popularization has on ethnomycology in the academic world, where the lack of verifiable evidence has kept its theories with their often far-reaching implications shrouded in controversy.

References

Sources

 Oswaldo Fidalgo, The ethnomycology of the Sanama Indians,  Mycological Society of America (1976), ASIN B00072T1TC
 E. Barrie Kavasch, Alberto C. Meloni, American Indian EarthSense: Herbaria of Ethnobotany and Ethnomycology, Birdstone Press, the Institute for American Indian Studies (1996). .
 Aaron Michael Lampman, Tzeltal ethnomycology: Naming, classification and use of mushrooms in the highlands of Chiapas, Mexico, Dissertation, ProQuest Information and Learning (2004)
 Jagjit Singh (ed.), From Ethnomycology to Fungal Biotechnology: Exploiting Fungi from Natural Resources for Novel Products, Springer (1999), .
 Keewaydinoquay Peschel.  Puhpohwee for the people: A narrative account of some use of fungi among the Ahnishinaubeg (Ethnomycological studies) Botanical Museum of Harvard University (1978),ASIN: B0006E6KTU

External links
"Aboriginal use of fungi", Australian National Botanic Gardens Fungi Web Site.
R.G. Wasson - Harvard University Herbaria
Carl A.P. Ruck - Boston University Department of Classical Studies
Albert Hofmann Foundation
Terence McKenna - Official site
John M. Allegro - Official site
Jan Irvin and Andrew Rutajit - Official site
Dan Merkur - Official site
Michael Hoffman
 Visionary Mushrooms Studies in Ethnomycology with Contributions by Gaston Guzman and Albert Hofmann

Ethnobotany
Branches of mycology